The Paleochristian Church is a ruined church in Lin, Korçë County, Albania. Mosaics from the 4th-5th century have been discovered during excavations. It is a Cultural Monument of Albania.

References

Cultural Monuments of Albania
Buildings and structures in Pogradec
Church ruins in Albania
Churches in Korçë County
Lin, Korçë